The 2015–16 season was the 71st season in the existence of the club. The team played in the Basketball League of Serbia, in the Adriatic League and in the Euroleague.

Overview 
The team started preparing for season 2015–16 by re-signing coach Dejan Radonjić and guard Branko Lazić for two years each. Team captain Luka Mitrović extended his contract until summer 2017. Marcus Williams, Boban Marjanović, Nikola Kalinić, Charles Jenkins and Jaka Blažič left the club, and roster was reinforced by Sofoklis Schortsanitis, Stefan Nastić, Ryan Thompson and Gal Mekel. From its development team FMP, Zvezda promoted MVP of 2015 FIBA Europe Under-20 Championship, Marko Gudurić. The first part of the season was marked by mixed results and a lot of squad changes. Due to serious injuries of Mitrović and Dangubić, club brought back Marko Simonović, and later on landed Quincy Miller. Out-of-form Schortsanitis and Mekel were replaced by Vladimir Štimac and returning Marcus Williams. Mid-season, the club also released Williams and Thompson, replacing them with Vasilije Micić and Tarence Kinsey. Results improved, and Red Star ended group stage of EuroLeague with a 5–5 score, reaching the third place of group A, qualifying for Top 16 stage. Successful European season continued as Zvezda ended fourth in Top 16 Group E, with a score of 7 wins and seven losses. In the playoffs, it was stopped by CSKA Moscow, who eventually went on to lift EuroLeague trophy. In ABA league, Zvezda entered playoffs from the second position, facing another EuroLeague team – Cedevita – and, defeating them twice, advanced to final series. In the finals, Zvezda pulled a 3-0 against Mega Leks, defending the ABA league title. Zvezda ended another spectacular season by defending the Serbian league title beating Partizan 3-1 in the finals.

Players

Squad information
Note: Flags indicate national team eligibility at FIBA sanctioned events. Players may hold other non-FIBA nationality not displayed.

Depth chart

Out on loan

Players In

Players Out

Notes:
 1 On loan during entire 2014–15 season.

Club

Technical Staff

Kit

Supplier: Champion
Main sponsor: mts

Back sponsor: Idea
Short sponsor:

Competitions

Overall

Overview

Adriatic League

League table

Results by round

Matches

Playoffs

EuroLeague

Regular season table

Regular season matches

Top 16 table

Top 16 matches

Playoffs

Serbian Super League

League table

Results by round

Matches

Playoffs

Radivoj Korać Cup

Individual awards

EuroLeague 
MVP of the Week

All-Euroleague Second Team

Adriatic League 
MVP of the Round

MVP of the Month

Ideal Starting Five

Serbian League 
Playoff MVP
  Maik Zirbes

Statistics

EuroLeague

See also 
 2015–16 Red Star Belgrade season
 2015–16 KK Partizan season

Notes

References

External links
 KK Crvena zvezda official website 
 Club info at the Adriatic League official site
 Club info at the EuroLeague official site

KK Crvena Zvezda seasons
2015–16 in Serbian basketball by club
Crvena zvezda